Edwin David Manton  (born 5 July 1936) is a retired Australian minister and former Moderator of the New South Wales Synod of the Uniting Church in Australia.

Early life
Manton was born in Sydney, the third son of Edwin Spencer Manton (b. 1899 - d.1951) and his second wife,  Eleanor Elizabeth (Nell) Hunt. He attended Newington College (1949-1953) the school founded by his great-grandfather Rev John Manton and attended by his father and maternal grandfather, Richard Hunt (b. 1852 - d.1929).

Clerical life
Manton was a minister in rural and city congregations of the Methodist Church of Australasia, and Uniting Church, and served on the Board of Missions as associate secretary for home and inland missions in NSW. Manton was awarded his doctorate in ministry from the San Francisco Theological Seminary.

Appointments
 Newington College Council (since 1984)

Honours
 Medal of the Order of Australia (2005) - For service to the community through a range of ministries within the Uniting Church in Australia.

References

1936 births
Living people
People educated at Newington College
Members of Newington College Council
Uniting Church in Australia ministers